The Art of War is the fourth album by Swedish heavy metal band Sabaton.

The album is based on the ancient Chinese military treatise, The Art of War written by General Sun Tzu in the 6th century BC. It consists of 13 chapters, each of which describe a different aspect of warfare, and is considered the definitive work on military tactics and strategies of its time. The tracks on the album correspond to each chapter of treatise. The lyrics of the songs are about famous battles or war, mostly based on the battles of the First and Second World Wars where Sun Tzu's tactics were applied.

The second track and first full song of the album, "Ghost Division", is notable as the song Sabaton usually plays first in live concerts, ever since the album's release.

Production
The Swedish national anthem from Sweden Rock '09 (found on the Re-Armed edition) was the only song on which bassist Pär Sundström has contributed vocals until 2012, when the line-up change required Sundström to step up to the microphone on a more permanent basis.

Spoken quotes from Sun Tzu's The Art of War can be heard in songs such as "Sun Tzu Says", "The Art of War", "Unbreakable", "The Nature of Warfare", "Cliffs of Gallipoli", "Union (Slopes of St. Benedict)", "The Price of a Mile", "Firestorm" and "A Secret". These quotes are taken from  LibriVox's audiobook version of the book, which follows the Lionel Giles translation.

Track listing

Different versions
The Art of War was released in three different versions, a standard edition containing only the CD, a vinyl version and a Limited Edition. The limited contains the full-length CD and the book The Art of War by Sun Tzu. The limited edition comes in a DVD case with alternate artwork. All preorders from the official Sabaton homepage also included the single, Cliffs of Gallipoli. In 2010 The album was re-released with other early Sabaton albums under their new label in a "Re-Armed" version that included several new bonus tracks.

Personnel 
 Joakim Brodén – vocals
 Rickard Sundén – guitars
 Oskar Montelius – guitars
 Pär Sundström – bass
 Daniel Mullback – drums
 Daniel Mÿhr – keyboards

In popular culture
"40:1" became a hit in Poland and Sabaton was asked to perform it on the Polish Independence Day celebration in Gdańsk in 2008. "40:1" is also used as an entrance song by Polish mixed martial artist Damian Grabowski.

The title track was featured in the Sabaton Soundtrack DLC for the grand strategy game Europa Universalis IV.

References

2008 albums
Sabaton (band) albums
Albums produced by Peter Tägtgren